Mohammadabad (also Romanized as Moḩammadābād) is a village in Kermajan Rural District, in the Central District of Kangavar County, Kermanshah Province, Iran. At the 2006 census, its population was 212, in 54 families.

References 

Populated places in Kangavar County